Carroll Township is a township in Vermilion County, Illinois, USA.  As of the 2010 census, its population was 612 and it contained 263 housing units.

History
Carroll Township was one of the eight townships created in 1851. It was also the name of one of the original two townships created in March 1826, the other being called Ripley Township. It was probably named for Charles Carroll of Carrollton, a signer of the Declaration of Independence. Abraham Carroll, a resident of the area, may have influenced the choice.

Geography

Cities and towns
 Indianola

Extinct towns
 Maizetown

Adjacent townships
 Catlin Township (north)
 Georgetown Township (northeast)
 Elwood Township (east)
 Ross Township, Edgar County (south)
 Young America Township, Edgar County (southwest)
 Sidell Township (west)
 Jamaica Township (northwest)

Cemeteries
The township contains seven cemeteries: Lebanon, Michael, Sandusky, Stunkard, Weaver, Woodlawn and Workheiser.

Demographics

School districts
 Georgetown-Ridge Farm Consolidated Unit School District 4
 Jamaica Community Unit School District 12

Political districts
 Illinois' 15th congressional district
 State House District 104
 State Senate District 52

References
 U.S. Board on Geographic Names (GNIS)
 United States Census Bureau 2007 TIGER/Line Shapefiles

External links
 US-Counties.com
 City-Data.com
 Illinois State Archives

Townships in Vermilion County, Illinois
Townships in Illinois